KF Vllaznia Shkodër B, commonly known as Vllaznia Shkodër B  was a football club based in Shkodër, Albania that folded in October 2020. It is the reserve team of KF Vllaznia Shkodër. The club last played in the Kategoria e Dytë, which is the third tier of football in the country.

Current squad

References

Vllaznia B
B Team